Mogila may refer to:

Places 
Mogila, North Macedonia, a village in the Republic of Macedonia
Mogila Municipality
FK Mogila, a football club
Mogiła, Lublin Voivodeship, a village in Poland
Mogiła Abbey, in Poland
, a village in Kaspichan Municipality, Bulgaria
, a village in Stara Zagora Municipality, Bulgaria
, a village in Tundzha Municipality, Bulgaria

Other uses 
Peter Mogila (1596–1647), Metropolitan of Kiev
Mogiła coat of arms
Moghilă family, a family of Moldavian nobility